Large-cell neuroendocrine carcinoma of the lung (LCNEC of the lung), or pulmonary large-cell neuroendocrine carcinoma (PLCNC), is a highly malignant neoplasm arising from transformed epithelial cells originating in tissues within the pulmonary tree. It is currently considered to be a subtype of large-cell lung carcinoma.

LCNEC is often generically grouped among the non-small-cell lung carcinomas.

Variants
The World Health Organization classification of lung tumors recognizes a variant of LCNEC, namely "combined large-cell neuroendocrine carcinoma" (c-LCNEC).

References

External links 
 Lung Cancer Home Page. The National Cancer Institute site containing further reading and resources about lung cancer.
 . World Health Organization Histological Classification of Lung and Pleural Tumours. 4th Edition.

Lung cancer